The Ferrari Challenge is a single-marque motorsport category that was created in 1993, initially catering to owners of the 348 Berlinetta who wanted to race their cars. The first European season took place in 1993, with a North American series added in 1994. It now encompasses five official championships in the North America, Asia-Pacific, Europe, UK, and Japan. Competitors from each series are brought together at the annual World Finals (Finali Mondiali) event. From 2007-10, the Ferrari Challenge exclusively used the Ferrari F430 model. 2011 saw the introduction of the 458 Challenge with the 458 Challenge Evoluzione following in 2014. In 2017 Ferrari introduced the 488 Challenge.

Series

Currently there are five distinct series, in Europe, in the United States, in Asia-Pacific, in the UK, and in Japan. Since 2001, the Ferrari Challenge is managed by Ferrari's Corse Clienti department ("customer racing").

Ferrari Challenge Italy
The now defunct Ferrari Challenge Italy used a two-class format in which distinguished between professional competition drivers in the Trofeo Pirelli (lit. "Pirelli Trophy") and amateur "gentleman drivers" in the Coppa Shell (lit. "Shell Cup"). This format has now been transferred to the Europe Challenge series. It was originally launched in 1993, with backing from Pirelli. Its popularity has resulted in a 2007 entry list of ten teams represented by 37 drivers. The Challenge Italy series is now merged with the European Challenge-series.

Ferrari Challenge Europe
The European series is a five-class championship, the classes are:
 Trofeo Pirelli
 Trofeo Pirelli Am
 Coppa Shell
 Coppa Shell Am
 Coppa Team

Ferrari Challenge North America

The North American also features the Trofeo Pirelli and Coppa Shell class system. This championship was inaugurated in 1994. It is organized by Ferrari North America and sanctioned by IMSA.

Ferrari Challenge Asia-Pacific
The Asia-Pacific is the most recent of the Challenge series since the 2011 season, inaugurated in combination with the growing interest and sales for Ferrari in Asia. The season encompasses events in Japan, China, Malaysia, Australia, New Zealand and Singapore. The Asia-Pacific also features the Trofeo Pirelli and Coppa Shell class system. Grid is made up of 35 to 40 drivers for the 2012 season.

Finali Mondiali
From 2013, the major Ferrari Challenge series (Europe, North America and Asia-Pacific) have combined to host a World Final common event for all championships. This event culminates in a race containing as many of the competitors across all series in both Trofeo Pirelli and Coppa Shell as can fit, with Ferrari declaring the winners to be "world champions". The following table has the winners of each event:

Champions

One-make racing

The Ferrari Challenge uses a single model from the manufacturer's road car range, suitably modified to make them safe for competition use. The lineage began with the 348 Berlinetta in 1993, followed by its successor, the F355 Berlinetta, and the 360 Modena was introduced in 2000. The F355 remained eligible during 2000 and 2001. The 360 Challenge Stradale version was the first competition-orientated version to be marketed to the public. The F430 Challenge was phased in during a transitional year in 2006, with the same being the case for the 458 Challenge in 2011. The F430 introduced carbon-ceramic brake discs for the first time and gained  over the 360CS, which has reduced lap times to approximately three seconds shy of the F430 GT2. The current 458 Challenge is the first to have driver controlled aids such as traction control, stability management and adjustable ABS brakes.

Ferrari Challenge racing cars
The 488 Challenge Evo is the most recent in a line of Ferraris used in the Ferrari Challenge series. The lineage is as follows:
 Ferrari 348 Challenge (1993–1995)
 Ferrari F355 Challenge (1995–2000)
 Ferrari 360 Modena Challenge (2000–2006)
 Ferrari F430 Challenge (2006–2011)
 Ferrari 458 Challenge (2011–2013)
 Ferrari 458 Challenge Evo (2014–2016)
 Ferrari 488 Challenge (2017–)
 Ferrari 488 Challenge Evo (2020–)

All the cars used in the series are track only, although some 360 Challenges have been made road legal in Australia, with extensive modifications. However, due to new legislation, this is not possible anymore. The 360 Modena Challenge used in the series should not be confused with the 360 Challenge Stradale, which was a road-legal, track day oriented version of the 360, similar to the 430 Scuderia.

Racing simulators based on the series
In 1999, Sega's producer Yu Suzuki created Ferrari F355 Challenge: Passione Rossa, a video game based on the Ferrari F355 Challenge series.

In 2008, System 3's Mark Cale created Ferrari Challenge: Trofeo Pirelli, the official game of the Ferrari Challenge featuring the licensed Ferrari F430 Challenge Italian, European and North American 2007 series.

In 2012, Ferrari Challenge appeared in Test Drive: Ferrari Racing Legends.

See also
 Porsche Supercup
 Porsche Carrera Cup
 Lamborghini Super Trofeo
 Trofeo Maserati
 Audi R8 LMS Cup

References

External links

 
 Ferrari Challenge North America
 2017 Ferrari 488 Challenge race car revealed

 
Sports car racing series
One-make series